Celina High School is a public high school located in Celina, Texas, United States. It is part of the Celina Independent School District located in northwestern Collin County and classified as a 4A school by the UIL. In 2015, the school was rated "Met Standard" by the Texas Education Agency.

Athletics
The Celina Bobcats compete in the following sports:

 Baseball
 Basketball
 Cheerleading
 Cross Country
 Football
 Golf
 Powerlifting
 Soccer
 Softball
 Swimming and Diving
 Tennis
 Track and Field
 Volleyball

State titles

In total, the Celina Bobcats have won 25 state titles across 8 sports

Football - 
1974(B) (Co-Champ), 1995(2A), 1998(2A/D2), 1999(2A/D2), 2000(2A/D2), 2001(2A/D2), 2005(2A/D2), 2007(3A/D2)
Longest all-time consecutive winning streak in Texas High School 11-man Football history at 68 games from 1998-2002 
Girls Cross Country - 
2002(3A), 2003(3A), 2021(4A), 2022(4A)
Girls Soccer -
2022(4A)
Baseball - 
2002(2A)
Boys Track - 
1969(B), 1970(B), 1991(2A), 2012(3A), 2013(3A)
Girls Track - 
1994(2A), 1995(2A), 2003(3A)
Softball - 
2011(3A)
Cheerleading - 
2022(4A)
Marching Band
2022(4A)

Notable alumni
Jordan Roos (class of 2012), NFL player for the Seattle Seahawks
Ryan Merritt (class of 2010), MLB pitcher
D'Anton Lynn (class of 2008), former NFL player and current coach for the Houston Texans
Jamie Blatnick (class of 2007), former NFL player
Anthony Lynn (class of 1987), former NFL player and former head coach of the Los Angeles Chargers. Two-time Super Bowl champion (XXXII and XXXIII).

Notable staff
 G.A. Moore, head coach who held the record for most wins in Texas high school football history until 2016.

References

External links

Celina Band
Celina Quarterback Club

High schools in Collin County, Texas
Public high schools in Texas